Malik ibn Anas  (‎ 711–795 CE / 93–179 AH), whose full name is Mālik bin Anas bin Mālik bin Abī ʿĀmir bin ʿAmr bin Al-Ḥārith bin Ghaymān bin Khuthayn bin ʿAmr bin Al-Ḥārith al-Aṣbaḥī al-Ḥumyarī al-Madanī, reverently known as al-Imām Mālik by Sunni Muslims, was an Arab Muslim jurist, theologian, and hadith traditionist. Born in the city of Medina, Malik rose to become the premier scholar of prophetic traditions in his day, which he sought to apply to "the whole legal life" in order to create a systematic method of Muslim jurisprudence which would only further expand with the passage of time. Referred to as the "Imam of Medina" by his contemporaries, Malik's views in matters of jurisprudence were highly cherished both in his own life and afterwards, and he became the founder of one of the four schools of Sunni law, the Maliki, which became the normative rite for the Sunni practice of much of North Africa, Al-Andalus (until expulsion of Muslims), a vast portion of Egypt, and some parts of Syria, Yemen, Sudan, Iraq, and Khorasan, and the prominent Sufi orders, including the Shadiliyya and the Tijaniyyah.

Perhaps Malik's most famous accomplishment in the annals of Islamic history is, however, his compilation of the Muwatta, one of the oldest and most revered Sunni hadith collections and one of "the earliest surviving Muslim law-book[s]," in which Malik attempted to "give a survey of law and justice; ritual and practice of religion according to the consensus of Islam in Medina, according to the sunna usual in Medina; and to create a theoretical standard for matters which were not settled from the point of view of consensus and sunna." Composed in the early days of the Abbasid caliphate, during which time there was a burgeoning "recognition and appreciation of the canon law" of the ruling party, Malik's work aimed to trace out a "smoothed path" (which is what al-muwaṭṭaʾ literally means) through "the farreaching differences of opinion even on the most elementary questions." Hailed as "the soundest book on earth after the Quran" by al-Shafi'i, the compilation of the Muwatta led to Malik being bestowed with such reverential epithets as "Shaykh of Islam", "Proof of the Community", "Imam of the Abode of Emigration", and "Knowledgeable Scholar of Medina" in later Sunni tradition.

According to classical Sunni tradition, the Islamic prophet Muhammad foretold the birth of Malik, saying: "Very soon will people beat the flanks of camels in search of knowledge and they shall find no one more expert than the knowledgeable scholar of Medina," and, in another tradition, "The people ... shall set forth from East and West without finding a sage other than the sage of the people in Medina." While some later scholars, such as Ibn Hazm and Tahawi, did cast doubt on identifying the mysterious wise man of both these traditions with Malik, the most widespread interpretation nevertheless continued to be that which held the personage to be Malik. Throughout Islamic history, Malik has been venerated as an exemplary figure in all the traditional schools of Sunni thought, both by the exoteric ulema and by the mystics, with the latter often designating him as a saint in their hagiographies. Malik's most notable student, Al-Shafi'i (who would himself become the founder of another of the four orthodox legal schools of Sunni law) later said of his teacher: "No one constitutes as great a favor to me in the Religion of God as Malik ... when the scholars of knowledge are mentioned, Malik is the guiding star."

Biography
Malik was born as the son of Anas ibn Malik (not the Sahabi with the same name) and Aaliyah bint Shurayk al-Azdiyya in Medina, . His family was originally from the al-Asbahi tribe of Yemen, but his great grandfather Abu 'Amir relocated the family to Medina after converting to Islam in the second year of the Hijri calendar, or 623 CE. His grandfather Malik ibn Abi Amir was a student of the second Caliph of Islam Umar and was one of those involved in the collection of the parchments upon which Quranic texts were originally written when those were collected during the Caliph Uthman era. According to Al-Muwatta, he was tall, heavyset, imposing of stature, very fair, with white hair and beard but bald, with a huge beard and blue eyes.

Teachers

Living in Medina gave Malik access to some of the most learned minds of early Islam. He memorized the Quran in his youth, learning recitation from Abu Suhail Nafi' ibn 'Abd ar-Rahman, from whom he also received his Ijazah, or certification and permission to teach others. He studied under various famed scholars including Hisham ibn Urwah and Ibn Shihab al-Zuhri.

Both Malik and al Zuhri were student to Nafi Mawla Ibn Umar, prestigious Tabi'un Imam and ex slave of Abdullah ibn Umar.

Along with Abu Hanifah (founder of the Hanafi Sunni Madh'hab), Imam Malik (who was a teacher of Imam Al-Shafi‘i, who in turn was a teacher of Imam Ahmad ibn Hanbal).

Golden Chain of Narration
Malik's chain of narrators was considered the most authentic and called Silsilat al-Dhahab or "The Golden Chain of Narrators" by notable hadith scholars including Muhammad al-Bukhari. The 'Golden Chain' of narration (i.e., that considered by the scholars of Hadith to be the most authentic) consists of Malik, who narrated from Nafi‘ Mawla ibn ‘Umar, who narrated from Ibn Umar, who narrated from Muhammad.

Mention in hadith
Muhammad reportedly said in a hadith authenticated by Muhammad ibn `Isa at-Tirmidhi: "Very soon will people beat the flanks of camels in search of knowledge, and they shall find no-one more knowledgeable than the knowledgeable scholar of Madina." Qadi Ayyad, Al-Dhahabi and others relate from Sufyan ibn `Uyaynah, ‘Abd ar-Razzaq as-San‘ani, Ibn Mahdi, Yahya ibn Ma'in, Dhu’ayb ibn `Imama, Ibn al-Madini, and others that they considered that scholar to be Malik ibn Anas.

Views

Theology
Abdul-Ghani Ad-Daqr wrote that Malik was 'the furthest of all people' from dialectic theology who was the most knowledgeable of their discussions without accepting their views. G.F. Haddad, on the other hand, argued that Malik was not completely averse to the idea of dialectic theology; on the contrary, Haddad points to Malik having studied 'at the feet of Ibn Hurmuz', a master in dialectic theology, for 'thirteen to sixteen years'.

Anthropomorphism
Malik's unique contributions to the field of theology specifically is that he was a strict opponent of anthropomorphism, and deemed it absurd to compare the attributes of God, which were given in "human imagery" such as that of God's "hands" or "eyes" with those of man. For example, when a man asked Malik about the meaning of Quran 20:5, "The Merciful established Himself over the Throne," it is related that "nothing affected Malik so much as that man's question," and the jurist fervently responded: "The 'how' of it is inconceivable; the 'establishment' part of it is known; belief in it is obligatory; asking about it is an innovation."

Beatific vision
Malik was a supporter of the orthodox Sunni doctrine of the beatific vision, and he is said to have cited Quran 75:22-23 ("That day will faces be resplendent, looking toward their Lord,") and 83:15 ("Nay! Verily, from their Lord, that day, shall they [the transgressors] be veiled,") as proof of his belief.

Faith's nature
When he was asked about the nature of faith, Malik defined it as "speech and works" (qawlun wa-'amal), which shows that Malik was averse to the rigorous separation of faith and works.

Intercession
Malik seems to have been a proponent of intercession in personal supplication. For example, it is related that when the Abbasid caliph al-Mansur asked Malik about whether it was preferable to face the Prophet's tomb or the qibla whilst doing the personal prayer or dua, Malik responded: "Why should you not face him when he is your means (wasīla) to God and that of your father Adam on the Day of Resurrection?" Regarding this tradition, the thirteenth-century hadith master Ibn Jamāʿa said: "The report is related by the two hadith masters Ibn Bashkuwāl and al-Qāḍī ʿIyāḍ in al-Shifā, and no attention is paid to the words of those who claim that it is forged purely on the basis of their idle desires." While both Ibn Taymiyyah and, much more recently, Muhammad ibn Abd al-Wahhab's grandson Sulaymān did indeed reject the authenticity of this tradition, their opinions were characterized by the vast majority of mainstream Sunni scholars such as al-Zarqānī as "stemming either from ignorance or arrogance." Historically, it is known that Malik's statements on the validity of intercession remained a core doctrine of the Maliki school, and practically all Maliki thinkers of the classical era accepted the idea of the Prophet's intercession. It is also known, moreover, that the classical "books of the Mālikīs are replete with the stipulation that du'ā [personal supplication] be made while facing the grave."

Mysticism
On the basis of several early traditions, it is evident that Malik held the early Sufis and their practices in high regard. It is related, moreover, that Malik was a strong proponent of combining the "inward science" (ilm al-bātin) of mystical knowledge with the "outward science" of jurisprudence. For example, the famous twelfth-century Maliki jurist and judge Qadi Iyad, later venerated as a saint throughout the Iberian Peninsula, narrated a tradition in which a man asked Malik "about something in the inward science," to which Malik replied: "Truly none knows the inward science except those who know the outward science! When he knows the outward science and puts it into practice, God shall open for him the inward science - and that will not take place except by the opening of his heart and its enlightenment." In other similar traditions, it is related that Malik said: "He who practices Sufism (tasawwuf) without learning Sacred Law corrupts his faith (tazandaqa), while he who learns Sacred Law without practicing Sufism corrupts himself (tafassaqa). Only he who combines the two proves true (tahaqqaqa)."

While there are a few traditions relating that Malik, while not an opponent of mysticism as a whole, was nonetheless adverse specifically to the practice of group dhikr, such traditions have been graded as being munkar or "weak" in their chain of transmission. Furthermore, it has been argued that none of these reports - all of which relate Malik's disapproving amusement at being told about an instance of group dhikr happening nearby - explicitly display any disapproval of the act as such, but rather serve as a criticism of "some people who passed for Sufis in his time [who] apparently committed certain excesses or breaches of the sacred law." As both their chains of transmission are weak and not consistent with what is related of Malik elsewhere, the traditions are rejected by many scholars, although latter-day critics of Sufism do occasionally cite them in support of their position.

Relics
Malik was a supporter of tabarruk or the "seeking of blessing through [the veneration of] relics." This is evident, for example, in the fact that Malik approvingly related the tradition of a certain Atā' ibn Abī Rabāh, whom he saw "enter the [Prophet's] Mosque, then take hold of the pommel of the Pulpit, after which he faced the qibla [to pray]," thereby supporting the holding of the pommel for its blessings (baraka) by virtue of its having touched Muhammad. Furthermore, it is also recorded that "when one of the caliphs manifested his intention to replace the wooden pulpit of the Prophet with a pulpit of silver and jewels," Malik exclaimed: "I do not consider it good that people be deprived of the relics of the Messenger of God!" (Lā arā yuḥrama al-nāsu āthāra rasūlillāh).

Sunnah of Muhammad

Malik considered following the sunnah of Muhammad to be of capital importance for every Muslim. It is reported that he said: "The sunnah is Noah's Ark. Whoever boards it is saved, and whoever remains away from it perishes."

Ethics

Differences of opinion

Accounts of Malik's life demonstrate that the scholar cherished differences of opinion amongst the ulema as a mercy from God to the Islamic community. Even "in Malik's time there were those who forwarded the idea of a unified madhhab and the ostensive removal of all differences between the Sunni schools of law," with "three successive caliphs" having sought to "impose the Muwatta and Malik's school upon the entire Islamic world of their time," but "Malik refused to allow it every time ... [for he held that the differences in opinion among the jurists]" were a "mercy" for the people. When the second Abbasid caliph al-Mansur said to Malik: "I want to unify this knowledge. I shall write to the leaders of the armies and to the rulers so that they make it law, and whoever contravenes it shall be put to death," Malik is said to have responded: "Commander of the Believers, there is another way. Truly, the Prophet was present in this community, he used to send out troops or set forth in person, and he did not conquer many lands until God took back his soul. Then Abu Bakr arose and he also did not conquer many lands. Then Umar arose after the two of them and many lands were conquered at his hands. As a result, he faced the necessity of sending out the companions of Muhammad as teachers and people did not cease to take from them, notable scholars from notable scholars until our time. If you now go and change them from what they know to what they do not know they shall deem it disbelief (kufr). Rather, confirm the people of each land with regard to whatever knowledge is there, and take this knowledge to yourself."

According to another narration, al-Mansur, after hearing Malik's answers to certain important questions, said: "I have resolved to give the order that your writings be copied and disseminated to every Muslim region on earth, so that they be put in practice exclusively of any other rulings. They will leave aside innovations and keep only this knowledge. For I consider that the source of knowledge is the narrative tradition of Medina and the knowledge of its scholars." To this, Malik is said to have replied: "Commander of the Believers, do not! For people have already heard different positions, heard hadith, and related narrations. Every group has taken whatever came to them and put it into practice, conforming to it while other people differed. To take them away from what they have been professing will cause a disaster. Therefore, leave people with whatever school they follow and whatever the people of each country chose for themselves."

Knowing the limits of knowledge
Malik is famous for declaring: "The shield of the 'alim is: 'I do not know.' If he neglects it, he will receive a mortal blow." Elsewhere, a certain Khālid ibn Khidāsh related: "I travelled all the way from Iraq to see Mālik about forty questions. He did not answer me except on five. Then he said: ʿIbn ʿIjlān used to say: If the 'alim bypasses 'I do not know,' he will receive a mortal blow." Likewise, al-Haytham ibn Jamīl said: "I saw Mālik ibn Anas being asked forty-eight questions, and he replied to thirty-two of them: 'I do not know.'" Later on, Malik's disciple, Ibn Wahb, related: "I heard ʿAbd Allāh ibn Yazīd ibn Hurmuz say: 'The 'ulema must instill in those who sit with him the phrase 'I do not know' until it becomes a foundational principle (asl) before them and they seek refuge in it from danger."

Religious disputation
Malik is said to have detested disputing in matters of religion, saying: "Disputation (al-jidāl) in the religion fosters self-display, does away with the light of the heart and hardens it, and produces aimless wandering." Needless argument, therefore, was disapproved of by Malik, and he also chose to keep silent about religious matters in general unless he felt obliged to speak in fear of "the spread of misguidance or some similar danger."

Social

Shaving the moustache
In the Muwatta, Malik writes: "Shaving the mustache is an innovation." Elsewhere, it is written that he "detested and condemned" shaving of the mustache and, furthermore, "disliked inordinate length for the beard." While several other scholars held both the clipping (qass) and the removal (ihfā) of the mustache to be sunnah, Malik only considered the former to be truly prophetically prescribed, deeming the latter an unpalatable innovation.

Physical appearance
The available physical descriptions of Malik relate that he "was tall, heavy-set, imposing of stature, very fair, with white beard ... [and] bald ... [with] blue eyes." Furthermore, it is also related that "he always wore beautiful clothes, especially [those that were] white."

Death

Imam Malik died at the age of 83 or 84 in Medina in 795 CE, and is buried in the cemetery of Al-Baqi', across from the Mosque of the Prophet. Although there was a small shrine constructed around his grave during the late medieval period, with many Muslims visiting it to pay their respects, the construction was razed to the ground by the Kingdom of Saudi Arabia during their campaign of demolishing many of the traditional Islamic heritage sites after the kingdom's establishment in 1932.

Malik's last words were related to one Isma'il ibn Abi Uways who said, "Malik became sick, so I asked some of our people about what he said at the time of his death. They said, "He recited the testification of faith and then he recited: To Allah belongs the command [i.e., decree] before and after.

Works
Imam Malik wrote: 
Al-Muwatta, one of the earlier Hadith collections. 
Al-Mudawwana al-Kubra, written down by Sahnun ibn Sa'id ibn Habib at-Tanukhi (c. 776-7 – 854–5) after the death of Malik ibn Anas.

See also
Salaf
Tabi' al-Tabi'in
The Seven Fuqaha of Medina

Further read

Online
 Mālik ibn Anas: Muslim legal scholar, in Encyclopædia Britannica Online, by The Editors of Encyclopaedia Britannica, Aakanksha Gaur, Marco Sampaolo and Adam Zeidan

References

Bibliography

External links
 
 Biodata at MuslimScholars.info
 Life of Imam Malik
 Biography of Imam Malik at Lost Islamic History
 Biography of Imam Malik
 A comprehensive Biography of Imam Malik
 Al-Muwatta' of Imam Malik
 Muslims of Norwich, a Maliki community
 :  BIOGRAPHY OF IMAM MALIK
  The lifestyle of Imâm Mâlik Ibn Anas (at-tawhid.net)
 Malik, Imam B Anas مَالِك بن أنس ; A complete biography on Imam Malik bin Anas

711 births
795 deaths
8th-century Arabs
8th-century Muslim theologians
Scholars from the Abbasid Caliphate
Arab scholars
Hadith compilers
Maliki fiqh scholars
Mujaddid
Sunni imams
Sunni Muslim scholars of Islam
Taba‘ at-Tabi‘in
Burials at Jannat al-Baqī